Åland is a constituency represented in the Parliament of Finland. It covers the autonomous administrative region of Åland, with a population of 29,489. It is the smallest constituency in Finland, and the only one that only elects one member of parliament. The region is guaranteed a special status in Finnish law, whereby it will always have at least one representative even if its population would not entitle it to one.

Continental Finnish political parties do not operate in Åland, and instead the region has its own parties. Elections to the Parliament are contested through common lists. As there is only one seat contested in Åland, the election there is practically done by first-past-the-post, unlike the proportional representation system used in the rest of Finland.

The current member of parliament for Åland is Mats Löfström (Åland Centre).

MPs for Åland

Election results

See also
 Electoral districts of Finland

References

Parliament of Finland electoral districts
Politics of Åland